Annalisa Vincent is a Guyanese footballer who plays as a forward for Silver Sands and the Guyana women's national team.

Vincent became the first Indigenous Guyanese women land an athletic scholarship at an American university.

Club career
Vincent has played for Silver Sands in Guyana.

International career
Vincent capped for Guyana at senior level during the 2018 CFU Women's Challenge Series.

International goals
Scores and results list Guyana goal tally first

See also
List of Guyana women's international footballers

References

Living people
Guyanese women's footballers
Women's association football forwards
Guyana women's international footballers
Year of birth missing (living people)